Cserta is a 16.6 km long stream in the hills of Zala, Hungary.

Cserta's spring is at the Kandikó Hill.  It becomes a larger stream after the Kerta stream flows into it at Mikekarácsonyfa. Its other main stream is the Lower Válicka, which ends at Páka. Cserta's watershed area is 441 km2. Cserta flows to the Kerka at the end.

References

Rivers of Hungary
Geography of Zala County